Daucus edulis (Portuguese: Cenoura-da-rocha) is a critically endangered species of flowering plant in the celery family Apiaceae. It is endemic to Madeira.

Description
It has a hard woody unbranched stem with annual flowers and light yellowish-green, markedly shiny radial leaves, broadly triangular at the edges with pubescent petioles. It has scattered, paniculate inflorescences.

The species was previously known as Monizia edulis.

Distribution and habitat
The species is endemic to Madeira Island and Deserta Grande Island and was once native to the Savage Islands. In 2008 its population was estimated to be around 50 individuals in a  area.

It is mainly threatened by the introduction of exotic species, human collection, fires, droughts, storms, and landslides.

Gallery

References

Daucus
Endemic flora of Madeira
Taxobox binomials not recognized by IUCN